The family Saturniidae comprises about 1300 species, of which just one occurs naturally in Great Britain, and one most likely brought across English Channel inadvertently by human agency:

 Saturnia pavonia, emperor moth — throughout
 Saturnia pyri, great peacock moth — possible immigrant (otherwise accidental import)

See also
List of moths of Great Britain (overview)
Family lists: Hepialidae, Cossidae, Zygaenidae, Limacodidae, Sesiidae, Lasiocampidae, Saturniidae, Endromidae, Drepanidae, Thyatiridae, Geometridae, Sphingidae, Notodontidae, Thaumetopoeidae, Lymantriidae, Arctiidae, Ctenuchidae, Nolidae, Noctuidae and Micromoths

References 
 Waring, Paul, Martin Townsend and Richard Lewington (2003) Field Guide to the Moths of Great Britain and Ireland. British Wildlife Publishing, Hook, UK. .

Moths
Britain